Ricky is the debut album by American actor and rock and roll musician Ricky Nelson, released in November 1957. The album topped the Billboard's Top LPs, becoming the first solo artist to chart under the age of 18.

Track listing
 "Honeycomb" (Bob Merrill) 2:54
 "Boppin' the Blues" (Carl Perkins, Howard Griffin) 1:56
 "Be-Bop Baby" (Pearl Lendhurst) 2:00
 "Have I Told You Lately that I Love You?" (Scotty Wiseman) 1:58
 "Teenage Doll" (George Lendhurst, Pearl Lendhurst) 1:40
 "If You Can't Rock Me" (Willie Jacobs) 1:53
 "Whole Lotta Shakin' Goin On" (Sunny David, Dave Williams) 2:11
 "Baby I'm Sorry" (Kenneth Scott) 2:21
 "Am I Blue?" (Harry Akst, Grant Clarke) 1:39
 "I'm Confessin'" (Doc Daugherty, Al Neiburg, Ellis Reynolds) 2:16
 "Your True Love" (Carl Perkins) 1:58
 "True Love" (Cole Porter) 2:17

Reception
Reception at the time of release is unknown. A recent review by Allmusic said that it is "derivative" but that "he also sang rhythmically in his smooth voice, negotiating the rock & roll beat with far greater ease than Pat Boone" and that "the 17-year-old continued to display the combination of natural pop instincts and genuine rock & roll feel that set him apart from the burgeoning pack of Elvis Presley imitators"

Chart history

See also
 1957 in music
 The Adventures of Ozzie and Harriet

References

External links

1957 debut albums
Ricky Nelson albums
Imperial Records albums